The Salter House in Argonia, Kansas is a historic house at 220 W. Garfield St. which was built in 1884–85.  It was listed on the National Register of Historic Places in 1971.

It was the home of Susanna M. Salter (1860–1961) who became internationally famous in 1887 when she became the first woman mayor in the United States.

The house was built by Susanna Salter's father, Oliver Kinsey from bricks he made himself.

References

Houses on the National Register of Historic Places in Kansas
Houses completed in 1884
National Register of Historic Places in Sumner County, Kansas